Netball at the 1991 South Pacific Games in Port Moresby, Papua New Guinea was held from 7–21 September 1991.

This was the sixth competition at the South Pacific Games for netball after missing the 1987 South Pacific Games. The winner of the event were the Cook Islands over the Papua New Guinea. Tonga took home the bronze.

Final standings

See also
 Netball at the Pacific Games

References

1991 Pacific Games
South Pacific Games
Netball at the Pacific Games
South Pacific